Steffi Graf was the defending champion but did not compete that year.

Julie Halard-Decugis won in the final 7–5, 7–6 against Iva Majoli.

Seeds
A champion seed is indicated in bold text while text in italics indicates the round in which that seed was eliminated. The top four seeds received a bye to the second round.

  Iva Majoli (final)
  Anke Huber (quarterfinals)
  Magdalena Maleeva (semifinals)
  Mary Pierce (second round)
  Jana Novotná (first round)
  Martina Hingis (second round)
  Nathalie Tauziat (second round)
  Helena Suková (first round)

Draw

Final

Section 1

Section 2

External links
 ITF tournament edition details
 Tournament draws

Open GDF Suez
1996 WTA Tour